The 2011 Texas Tech Red Raiders football team represented Texas Tech University as a member of the Big 12 Conference during the 2011 NCAA Division I FBS football season. Led by second-year by head coach Tommy Tuberville, the Red Raiders compiled an overall record of 5–7 with a mark of 2–7 in conference play, placing ninth in the Big 12. 2011 was the first losing season for Texas Tech since the 1992 season and the Red Raiders failed to qualify for a bowl game for the first time since the 1999s season. The team played home games at Jones AT&T Stadium in Lubbock, Texas.

Texas Tech started the season 4–0 before losing two close games to No. 24 Texas A&M and No. 17 Kansas State. The Red Raiders then beat No. 3 Oklahoma, 41–38, improving to 5–2 and entering the AP Poll at No. 19. The team lost their final five games, four by at least 24 points, including a 66–6 loss to No. 2 Oklahoma State.

Defensive coordinator Chad Glasgow and Texas Tech mutually agreed to part ways following the season. The team's defense ranked 117th in points allowed per game, allowing an average of 39.25.

Previous season

The 2010 team, led by Tommy Tuberville in his first year as Texas Tech's head coach, finished with an overall record of 8–5 and a Big 12 record of 3–5. The team went 1–3 against ranked opponents, with the team's only victory over a ranked team being a 24–17 win over no. 14 Missouri. The team was invited to the inaugural TicketCity Bowl, where they defeated Northwestern 45–38.

Schedule

  Kickoff was originally scheduled for 7:00 p.m., but was delayed due to lightning and rain showers.

Roster

Game summaries

Texas State

The Red Raiders opened their 2011 season at home against the Texas State Bobcats, marking the 950th overall contest in the program's 86-year history. Texas Tech won the coin toss and elected to receive. Their first drive would end in a punt by Ryan Erxleben from their own 26 yard line. The first score of the game came by way of a 40-yard Texas State field goal by Will Johnson on their first drive. On the next drive the Red Raiders fumbled the ball on their own 41 yard. Texas State capitalized on this turnover with a rushing touchdown by Marcus Curry. The Bobcats' Will Johnson kicked the extra point, to bring the score to 10–0. The Red Raiders' first score of the 2011 season came on their next drive, in which Seth Doege completed a 41-yard pass to Darrin Moore and another 10 yard pass to true freshman Bradley Marquez for the touchdown. Donnie Carona successfully converted the extra point for a score of 10–7. On the kickoff following the touchdown, the Bobcats' Shaun Rutherford was tripped up by his own defender and fell at his own 1 yard line. On the next play, Bobcats' quarterback Shaun Rutherford was penalized for intentional grounding which resulted in safety giving the Red Raiders' two more points and the ball back. Neither team would score during the remainder of the first half, and at halftime the Red Raiders trailed 10–9.

The Red Raiders dominated the second half, shutting out the Bobcats. In the third quarter the Red Raiders scored three touchdowns, the first on a 20-yard pass from Seth Doege to Darrin Moore. Following the first touchdown, Texas Tech unsuccessfully attempted a two–point conversion but held their first lead at 15–10. The second score of the third quarter came on the Red Raiders' next drive when Eric Stephens ran 46 yards for a touchdown. Donnie Carona added the extra point to bring the score to 22–10. On Texas State's next possession, the Bobcats fumbled on their own 36 yard line. The Red Raiders capitalized on the fumble with an Eric Stephens 2 yard rushing touchdown four plays later. Donnie Carona converted the extra point. That drive was the last of the third quarter, and brought the score to 29–10.

The fourth quarter scoring again consisted of three Red Raider touchdowns. The first was a 20-yard pass by Seth Doege to Tramain Swindall, during their first drive of the quarter. The second score came four drives later, when DeAndre Washington ran 23 yards for a touchdown. The final touchdown of the game came on the next Red Raider drive with 3 yard pass to Eric Ward from backup quarterback Jacob Karam. Donnie Carona successfully converted each of the three extra point attempts during the fourth quarter. The final score was 50–10.

New Mexico

After a bye weekend on September 10, Texas Tech faced New Mexico on the road in Albuquerque on September 17. The Red Raiders fielded a young team, especially on defense, with true freshmen Blake Dees and Sam Equavoen getting their first starting assignments at linebacker, and redshirt Jackson Richards starting at defensive end.  Texas Tech came into the game with a 35–6–2 all-time record against New Mexico.

Despite two weather delays in the game caused by lightning strikes nearby, the Red Raiders rolled to a 59–13 rout of the Lobos. Texas Tech quarterback Seth Doege tied a school record by completing all 15 of his first 15 passes. Overall, he finished 40 for 44, a 90.9 completion percentage, setting an NCAA record for quarterbacks with at least 40 completions in a game. The former record, 49 for 59 (83%), was held by Red Raider Kliff Kingsbury.

Doege connected on a pair of first-quarter touchdown passes to Darrin Moore as the Red Raiders jumped out to a 14–0 lead. Doege hit Eric Ward on a 1-yard touchdown pass early in the second quarter, and wide receiver Austin Zouzalik threw a touchdown pass to Darrin Moore as Texas Tech increased its lead to 28–0. Texas Tech's lead was 38–7 at halftime. Texas Tech's domination continued in the third quarter as Doege threw scoring passes to Ward and tight end Jace Amaro. Texas Tech's final touchdown in the fourth quarter came as true freshman Ronnie Daniels, a graduate of Albuquerque's La Cueva High School, ran in the ball from nine yards out. For his performance in the game, Doege was nominated for the Capital One Impact Performance award. He was also nominated for and won the AT&T ESPN All-America Player of the Week award. Doege was named the Big 12 Conference Co-Offensive Player of the Week for his record performance, sharing the honor with Missouri running back Henry Josey.

Nevada

Seth Doege rallied the Red Raiders from a two-score third quarter deficit to win 35–34 with the game-winning touchdown toss to Eric Ward with 36 seconds left.  Wolf Pack quarterback Cody Fajardo broke loose for a 56-yard touchdown to give Nevada a 28–14 lead over the Red Raiders with 5:29 remaining in the third quarter, but Texas Tech's defense held Nevada to a pair of field goals in the fourth quarter as the Red Raiders mounted their comeback.  Trailing 34–28, the Red Raiders got the ball with less than 5 minutes remaining and drove 56 yards in 9 plays for the winning score. Doege connected with Ward on a fourth-down play from the Nevada 4-yard line for the winning touchdown.

Kansas

The Red Raiders traveled to Lawrence, Kansas to open Big 12 Conference play against the Jayhawks. The Red Raiders fell behind the Jayhawks 20–0 in the first half but scored 24 straight points to take a 24–20 lead in the second quarter. True freshman DeAndre Washington scored on a 1-yard run for Texas Tech's first touchdown, and Seth Doege hooked up with Eric Ward for a 40-yard touchdown pass on Texas Tech's next possession. Ward's touchdown came just one play after Texas Tech safety D.J. Johnson intercepted a pass by KU's Jordan Webb.  Johnson intercepted Webb again on Kansas's next possession, and Doege found Jacoby Franks for a 13-yard touchdown to give Texas Tech a 21–20 lead halfway through the second quarter. Donnie Carona added a 46-yard field goal to extend Texas Tech's lead to 24–20, but the Jayhawks scored just before halftime to take a 27–24 lead.

Texas Tech put the game away with a 21–0 run in the third quarter. Eric Stephens scored on runs of 1 and 8 yards, and Ward pulled in another Doege pass for a touchdown and a 45–27 Red Raider lead with time running out in the third quarter. Texas Tech's final touchdown pass came after an interception by Red Raider linebacker Cquilin Hubert in the end zone. Doege finished with 366 yards passing, and Stephens added 124 rushing yards in Texas Tech's Big 12 season-opening victory.

Texas A&M

In the final game between Texas Tech and Texas A&M as Big 12 Conference opponents, the Aggies jumped out to a halftime lead and held on for the victory. The Aggies scored on five of their six first-half possessions to take a 31–20 lead. Aggie quarterback Ryan Tannehill opened the scoring with a 19-yard touchdown run, but the Raiders tied the score at 7–7 with a 2-yard touchdown pass to Adam James. Texas Tech's offense added a pair of Donnie Carona field goals and a touchdown run by Eric Stephens to stay within 11 points at halftime. Stephens rushed for 102 yards on 22 carries, but he was lost for the season when he suffered a knee injury late in the third quarter. Stephens was on pace to become the first Texas Tech 1,000-yard rusher since 1998, averaging 114 yards per game through his first five games of the season. He finished the year with 570 yards on 109 carries and eight touchdowns.

Kansas State

Texas Tech's offense had 580 yards to Kansas State's 339, but several key mistakes would lead to the Red Raiders' defeat.

On Texas Tech's first drive, a Seth Doege pass was intercepted by Nigel Malone, who returned it 24-yards for a touchdown. In the second quarter, two Donnie Carona field goals were blocked: a 48-yard attempt and a 38-yard attempt, the second one being returned 36 yards by Malone. Texas Tech scored its second touchdown in the second quarter on a 7-yard run by DeAndre Washington. On the ensuing kickoff, Tyler Lockett returned Carona's kick 100-yards for a touchdown, but Anthony Cantele missed the extra point. The Red Raiders turned the ball over three times in the fourth quarter, all by Doege. With 13:24 left and down 31–34, Doege was sacked by Meshak Williams, who recovered the ball for Kansas State. On the next drive, the Wildcats would turn the ball over on downs at the Texas Tech 27-yard line. On the first play of the ensuing drive, Doege threw another interception; Kansas State would score on the following drive to go up 41–31. Texas Tech's next drive would end with a Doege interception, but the Wildcats would miss a 31-yard field goal on their next drive. With 2:32 left to play, Carona made a 19-yard field goal to make the score 34–41 in favor of Kansas State. Texas Tech would recover the ensuing onside kick, but the drive ended on a turnover on downs. Kansas State took over on downs and ran the clock out to win 41–34.

Seth Doege threw for 461 yards and a touchdown along with a rushing touchdown, but threw three interceptions and lost a fumble.

Oklahoma

Kickoff was originally scheduled for 7:00 p.m., but was delayed to 8:45 due to showers in the area.

The Red Raiders' victory over the Sooners ended Oklahoma's 39-game home winning streak, which started in 2005 after a loss to TCU in the season opener. The game was the Sooners’ first Big 12 Conference loss at Owen Field since 2001, and only the third time the team has lost at home under Bob Stoops. The Red Raiders were named the Tostitos Fiesta Bowl National Team of the Week for games of the weekend of October 22.

Seth Doege threw for 441 yards and four touchdown passes, three of them to Alex Torres, as the Red Raiders built a 24–7 halftime lead. Texas Tech's lead grew to 31–7 as Doege connected with Torres on a fade route for Torres' third touchdown of the night.  The Sooners came storming back on a night in which the opening kickoff was delayed more than 90 minutes because of stormy weather. Oklahoma closed to within 31–24, but a Donnie Carona field goal and a touchdown pass from Doege to Oklahoma native Tramain Swindall built Texas Tech's lead back to 41–24. The Sooners added two late touchdowns, but tailback Aaron Crawford recovered Oklahoma's desperation onside kick attempt with time running out, and the Red Raiders were able to run out the clock for the win. With the victory, Texas Tech entered the national rankings for the first time in the season. The AP sports writers' poll placed Texas Tech at No. 19, and the USA Today Coaches Poll included Texas Tech at No. 22.

This was the last time Texas Tech defeated Oklahoma until 2022.

Iowa State

A week after upsetting Oklahoma, Texas Tech hosted Iowa State, which came into the game with a 3–4 record and a 0–4 mark in Big 12 play. The Cyclones jumped out to a 21–0 lead, but the Raiders scored on a Seth Doege touchdown run to narrow the halftime lead to 24–7. However, the Cyclones scored on their opening possession of the second half, and their defense shut out the Raiders for the rest of the game as they held on for a 41–7 rout. Iowa State rang up 368 rushing yards and over 500 yards of total offense.

Texas

Texas Tech's defense struggled, giving up 595 total yards of offense, including 439 rushing yards; the Red Raiders' offense finished the game with 411 yards. Texas never punted the ball during the game.

Oklahoma State

Texas Tech struggled on both sides of the ball, with the defense giving up 637 yards and the offense only managing 270 yards. The Red Raiders only scored once during the entire game, with Cornelius Douglas recovering a fumble and returning it 37 yards for a touchdown.

Missouri

Texas Tech led for most of the game, but were shutout in the 4th quarter while also giving up 14 points. Missouri took its first lead of the game with 2:22 left on a 9-yard run from quarterback James Franklin. On the next drive, the Red Raiders marched down the field to the Tigers' 7-yard line, but a Seth Doege pass was intercepted by Michael Sam (Texas Tech's only turnover of the game) with 0:32 left to play.

This is the last game played between Texas Tech and Missouri as conference members, as Missouri began playing in the Southeastern Conference the following year.

Baylor

Texas Tech's defense gave up 360 rushing yards, but forced and recovered four fumbles. Backup quarterback Jacob Karam appeared for one play, throwing a 43-yard touchdown pass to Darrin Moore. Texas Tech attempted and recovered an onside kick on the ensuing kickoff, but the drive ended with a punt. Seth Doege threw two interceptions while running back Kenny Williams and wide receiver Adam Jones both each lost a fumble.

Statistics

Scoring
Scores against non-conference opponents

Scores against the Big 12

Scores against all opponents

Rankings

References

Texas Tech
Texas Tech Red Raiders football seasons
Texas Tech Red Raiders football